This is a list of international prime ministerial trips made by Theresa May, who served as the 54th Prime Minister of the United Kingdom from 13 July 2016 until her resignation on 24 July 2019. Theresa May made 73 trips to 33 countries during her premiership.

The number of visits per country: 
 One visit to Argentina, Bahrain, Bulgaria, Estonia, Egypt,  India, Iraq, Kenya, North Macedonia, Malta, Nigeria, Norway, Slovakia, South Africa, Spain and Turkey
 Two visits to Austria, Canada, China, Denmark, Ireland, Japan, Jordan, Saudi Arabia and Sweden
 Three visits to Netherlands, Poland and Switzerland
 Four visits to Italy and the United States
 Nine visits to Germany
 Ten visits to  France  
 Twenty-seven visits to Belgium

2016

2017

2018

2019

Multilateral meetings
Theresa May participated in the following summits during her premiership:

See also
 Foreign relations of the United Kingdom
 List of international prime ministerial trips made by David Cameron
 List of international prime ministerial trips made by Boris Johnson
 List of international prime ministerial trips made by Rishi Sunak

References

International prime ministerial trips
2016 in international relations
2017 in international relations
2018 in international relations
2019 in international relations
State visits by British leaders
Foreign relations of the United Kingdom
May
May
British prime ministerial visits
21st century in international relations